is an ancient castle town and the center of Kitakyushu, Japan, guarding the Straits of Shimonoseki between Honshu and Kyushu with its suburb Moji. Kokura is also the name of the penultimate station on the southbound San'yō Shinkansen line, which is owned by JR West. Ferries connect Kokura with Matsuyama on Shikoku, and Busan in South Korea.

History

Edo period

The Ogasawara and Hosokawa clans were daimyō at Kokura Castle during the Edo period (1603–1868). Miyamoto Musashi, samurai swordsman, author of The Book of Five Rings and founder of the Hyoho Niten Ichi-ryū, famous for its use of two swords, lived in the Kokura castle under the patronage of the Ogasawara and Hosokawa clans briefly during 1634.

Meiji period
After the end of the Tokugawa Shogunate, Kokura was the seat of government for Kokura Prefecture. When the municipal system of cities, towns and villages was introduced, Kokura Town was one of 25 towns in the prefecture, which later merged with Fukuoka Prefecture. Kokura was upgraded to city status in 1900.

World War II
Kokura was the primary target for the "Fat Man" bomb on August 9, 1945, but on the morning of the raid, the city was obscured by morning fog. Kokura had also been mistaken for the neighboring city of Yahata the day before by the reconnaissance missions. Since the mission commander Major Charles Sweeney had orders to drop the bomb visually and not by radar, he diverted to the secondary target, Nagasaki.

Post-war
When the city of Kitakyushu was created in 1963, Kokura was divided into Kokura Kita ward in the north, and Kokura Minami ward in the south.

Notable residents
Matsumoto Seichō – writer
Miyamoto Musashi – swordsman and rōnin
Mori Ōgai – physician, translator, novelist and poet
Tetsuya Theodore Fujita – Meteorologist

Notable figures born in Kokura
 Tsukasa Hojo, mangaka
 Leiji Matsumoto, mangaka
 Masumi Mitsui, 10th Battalion, CEF.
 Linda Yamamoto, singer and J-pop idol
 Satoru Nomura, Yakuza godfather, leader of the Kudo-kai

Festivals
The Gion Festival of Kokura is called the "Gion of Drums" and celebrates the life of local folk-hero Muhomatsu.

Notable facts
The city is the site of the main dojo (honbu) of Miyamoto Musashi's sword school, Hyoho Niten Ichi-ryū.

See also
Kokura Kita-ku
Kokura Minami-ku
Kokura Prefecture
Atomic bombings of Hiroshima and Nagasaki

References

Atomic bombings of Hiroshima and Nagasaki
Kitakyushu